Brett Elias Bodine III (born January 11, 1959) is an American former stock car racing driver, former driver of the pace car in Cup Series events, and current NASCAR employee. Brett is the younger brother of 1986 Daytona 500 winner Geoff Bodine and the older brother of 2006 and 2010 NASCAR Camping World Truck Series champion Todd Bodine. He was born in Chemung, New York. Brett has been named one of the 50 greatest NASCAR modified drivers of all time, was the runner-up for the 1986 Xfinity Series championship, and collected a total of five Xfinity Series wins and sixteen pole positions.  Brett made 480 Cup series starts with one win and five pole positions.  He has led over 1,000 career laps in both the NASCAR Cup series and the NASCAR Xfinity series.

Early life
Bodine attended Alfred State College and received an associate's degree in mechanical engineering before he became a professional race car driver.  He began in hobby stock races at the Chemung Speedrome (owned by his parents) in 1977. In 1979 Brett started racing a part-time schedule in the NASCAR Modified Nation Championship series, placing 35th in the final standings.  In the 1980 Brett moved up to 24th in the final standings with a best finish of third at Stafford Motor speedway, still driving a part time schedule.  In 1983 Brett picked up his first National Championship win at Stafford Motor Speedway while placing 7th in the final standings. He also placed 5th in the Northeast Region of the NASCAR Winston Weekly Racing series with 6 wins in 54 starts. In 1984 Brett picked up another National Championship win, this time at Oxford Maine. He also placed 12th in the Northeast Region of the NASCAR Winston Weekly Racing series with 3 wins in 37 starts and helped his car-owner secure the Stafford Motor Speedway track championship. At the conclusion of the 1984 season Brett moved south to go to work for Rick Hendrick, whom his brother Geoff was driving for at the time.

NASCAR beginnings 
While working for Rick, Brett found time to make a handful of modified starts in 1985 and won the most prestigious event of the season, the Race of Champions at Pocono. The 1985 season also saw Bodine make his debut in the NASCAR Xfinity Series in the #15 Pontiac at Bristol. The small team did not have a pit crew and had to do the whole race on a single set of tires but Brett managed to qualify 7th and finish 12th in his debut race. Brett's breakout race in NASCAR came when rain forced a scheduling conflict between the Xfinity race at Martinsville and the Cup Series race. Geoff Bodine (who was driving full-time for Hendrick in the Cup Series)  was scheduled to drive in the Xfinity race and Brett got the chance to drive Rick Hendrick's #5 Pontiac as a last minute fill-in.  Brett started second and won the race in only his second career start. This was the first win for Hendrick with the Levi Garrett sponsorship and resulted in Brett getting funding from Levi Garrett to run 11 additional races that season.  Brett's under the lights win at Bristol win was the first Xfinity series race to be televised live in prime time. By the end of the 1985 season Brett had made thirteen starts with three poles, three wins, 7 top fives, and 10 top tens.

Bodine's success in the part-time Busch series ride in 1985 lead to a full time opportunity in 1986, driving the No. 00 Thomas Brothers Old Country Ham Oldsmobile for Howard Thomas. Rick Hendrick was not interested in fielding a full time Busch series team but helped Brett bring an associate sponsorship from Exxon over to the 00 team. Brett picked up his first pole of 1986 in the second race of the season at Rockingham, leading 18 laps before falling out with mechanical trouble. Brett picked up his second pole of the season at Martinsville and lead the first 21 laps before getting hit by Kyle Petty while working lapped traffic and then taken out in a second incident later in the race. Three DNFs in the season's first 5 races left Brett 14th in points.  Brett then recorded 9 straight top 10 finishes and another pole at Dover to move to 2nd in the points standings. This streak was followed by back to back DNFs at IRP and South Boston and dropped Brett to 7th in points after the season's 16th race. Brett rallied to finish the season with 15 straight top 10 finishes including wins at Bristol and the season finale at Martinsville. After Jack Ingram was suspended for two races for driving backwards on track, the championship came down to a battle between Brett and Larry Pearson. Brett briefly lead the standings after the season's 28th race, and with three races to go (Hickory, Rockingham, and Marintsiville) trailed by 12 points. Brett qualified on the pole at Hickory but the race was cancelled because, allegedly, the promoter did not want to pay the purse and intentionally damaged the track which cost Brett the chance to gain ground on Pearson. At the season finale, Brett qualified on pole and won the race but ended up placing 2nd to Larry Pearson by just 7 points in the final standings while totaling 16 top fives and 24 top tens to go along with his series-best 8 pole positions. Brett was voted the series most popular driver at the conclusion of the season.  In addition to his full time Xfinity Series schedule, Bodine made four modified starts in 1986, winning two, both of which were NASCAR Modified National Championship events held at Martinsville. Bodine also made his Winston Cup Debut in 1986, driving the No. 2 Exxon Chevy in the Coca-Cola 600. Bodine started 32nd and finished 18th in the Rick Hendrick owned entry, earning the bonus money for being the highest finishing rookie driver.

Bodine again drove the full Busch series schedule in the No. 00 Oldsmobile in 1987.  Although he failed to find victory lane, he accumulated 5 poles, 8 top fives, 17 top tens, and finished 3rd in the championship.  In May for the 7th Cup Series race of the season at North Wilksboro Bodine was chosen to replace the injured Terry Labonte on the pace lap in Junior Johnson's #11 Budweiser Chevy. Despite starting from the rear of the field after the driver change, he managed to finish in 8th place. Brett also replaced Labonte on the pace laps the next week at Bristol. Again starting from the rear of the field, Brett ran as high as 2nd and finished in 9th place. While Terry Labonte is credited with the finishes due to the NASCAR rules regarding driver changes at the time, Bodine's success as a fill-in driver lead to a ride for 14 Cup races in Hoss Ellington's part time No. 1 Bulls-Eye Barbecue Sauce Chevy.  In Brett's first event with the Ellington team he qualified on pole for the Winston Open and placed 6th. He returned to Charlotte the next weekend and qualified 9th for the 600 and lead 17 laps (the first cup laps lead of his career) but was collected in a wreck while running in the top 10 and eventually fell out of the race with an engine issue. At Daytona Brett qualified 7th, lead a lap, and finished a season-best 11th, the first lead lap finish of his cup career. For the season he had 5 top 10 qualifying efforts in the #1 car and 5 top 20 finishes.

Moving up 

In 1988, Bodine moved to the Cup series full-time for Bud Moore Engineering driving the No. 15 Crisco Thunderbird. In the 4th race of the season at Atlanta Brett qualified 5th and finished 9th, recording his first top 10 finish.  In the Coca-Cola 600 at Charlotte Brett led the race 5 times for a total of 96 laps collecting both the half way leader bonus and the hard charger bonus money. Brett’s car dropped a cylinder late in the race and he held on to finish 4th (the first top 5 finish of his career).  In the Oakwood Homes 500, also at Charlotte, Brett led the race 3 times for a total of 50 laps before getting passed for the lead by race winner Rusty Wallace with 12 laps to go and ultimately finishing 3rd.  The team was plagued by engine issues all season, falling out of races 7 times while fighting through engine issues in others. For the season Bodine posted 5 top-10 finishes and finished 20th in points.  Brett was not eligible for the Rookie of the Year award in 1988 (which was won by Ken Bouchard who finished 25th in points with 1 top 10) as he had run too many races as a part time driver in 1987.

Bodine returned to Budd Moore's team in 1989 driving the No. 15 Motorcraft Ford. Brett recorded a top 5 finish at Michigan and a total of 6 top tens, moving up one spot to finish the season 19th in points. He also placed 2nd in the Winston Open, just missing out on making the All-Star Race.  Overall, Brett's performance improved in his sophomore campaign as Brett's average finished improved by three spots. Late in the 1989 season, Brett made the decision to leave Bud Moore's team due to that team's sponsorship uncertainty for the 1990 season. Brett also had disagreements with Bud Moore on the type of chassis that the team was using (rear steer vs. front steer).

Bodine's breakout season came in 1990 driving the No. 26 Quaker State Buick Regal for champion drag racer Kenny Bernstein and crew chief Larry McReynolds. Bodine won his first Cup Series race in the 7th race of the season at North Wilkesboro Speedway, which came under some controversy as some felt that Darrell Waltrip was robbed of the win. Brett had led 63 laps in the middle of the race and then re-took the lead on lap 318 after short pitting on a round of green flag pit stops.  When the caution came out on lap 321, the pace car mistakenly picked up Dale Earnhardt as the race leader, putting Brett almost a full lap in front of the entire field. During the ensuing confusion of a 17 lap caution flag (NASCAR did not have electronic scoring at the time) Bodine was able to make a pit stop for fresh tires without losing any positions. When NASCAR reset the lineup with Bodine as the leader, he led the final 83 laps of the race (a race-high 146 laps overall) to take the victory.  "We messed up," said Chip Williams, NASCAR's public relations director. "By throwing the caution on the second-place car, it kept Bodine in the lead. He slipped into the pits and came out without losing the lead because the pace car was keeping the second-place car back. We messed up by picking up the wrong car. It was a judgment call, and you can't overrule a judgment call."  Despite the controversy, the win stood and would prove to be Bodine's only career cup series win, the final cup series win for Buick, the final win for Bernstein's team, the first oval win for Larry McReynolds, and the only oval track victory for Bernstein's team.  From Dover in 1989 through Talladega in 1990, Brett was running at the finish of 16 consecutive races, the longest streak in the Cup Series at the time.  Brett made his first appearance in the All-Star race in 1990 and won his first pole position at the fall event at Charlotte Motor Speedway.  At the conclusion of 1990 Brett was a career-best 12th in the championship standings with 5 top five finishes (both Wilksboro races, Pocono, Watkins Glen, and Martinsville) and a total of 9 top ten finishes.

After having improved his average finish in each of his cup seasons to date Brett returned to the King Racing No. 26 car in 1991 with high hopes.  Unfortunately, crew chief McReynolds left the team after the season's 4th race at Atlanta to join Davey Alison at Robert Yates Racing. McReynolds was replaced by Clyde Booth. In the season's 7th race, Brett had a strong run in his attempt to win back to back First Union 400s at North Wilksboro. Brett started from the pole position and lead 103 of the race's first 218 laps.  On lap 219, as the race leader, Brett was wrecked by the lapped car of Ricky Rudd on a restart, ending his day.  Even with the crew chief change and the wreck at Wilksboro, Brett was 15th in points after placing 11th in the 9th race of the season.  However, the 26 team struggled with reliability issues for the remainder of 1991, falling out of 10 of the season's final 20 races due to engine failures.  Bodine managed a strong run at the fall Martinsville race, leading a total of 59 laps from the 2nd starting position before getting passed for the lead by race winner Harry Gant with 47 laps to go and finishing 2nd.  Brett made his 2nd consecutive appearance in the All-Star race in 1991. For the season Brett had 2 top five (both at Martinsville) and six top 10 finishes but the reliability issues pushed the team down to 19th in the championship standings.

For 1992 the No. 26 team switched from Buick to Ford and Donnie Richeson, Brett's brother in law at the time, came on as the team's crew chief.  Bodine won the poll at Dover and recorded top five finishes at Darlington and Martinsville. In the spring race at Martinsville he qualified 3rd and took the race lead with 36 laps remaining but a broken rear axle with 27 laps remaining dropped Brett to 8th place, two laps down, at the finish.  In the fall race at Martinsville Brett led a total of 65 laps before getting passed for the lead by race winner Geoff Bodine with 43 laps to go and finishing 3rd.  From Sonoma through Phoenix in 1992, Brett was running at the finish of 17 consecutive races, tied for the longest streak in the Cup Series at the time.  Brett also qualified on pole and finished 6th in the Winston Open.  For the season Brett totaled a career-best 13 top ten finishes, a career best average start of 8.1 (2nd best in the Cup series for 92), and a career best average finish of 15.4 en route to 15th place in the overall standings.

1993 saw Bodine register pole positions at Wilksboro and Michigan, a runner-up finish in the Southern 500 at Darlington, additional top five finishes at Pocono and Richmond, and a total of 9 top ten finishes.  Brett also finished 3rd in the Winston Open to qualify for the All Star Race for the 3rd time and placed a career-best 10th in that race.  Brett crashed in qualifying for Dover and was forced to miss the race due to a broken wrist and a small brain bruise.  He returned to race again the next week at Martinsville and placed 20th in the championship standings.

In 1994 Bodine finished 2nd in the season opening Busch Clash.  Brett had his best race of the season in the Inaugural Brickyard 400 running in the top 5 throughout the race, leading 10 laps, and placing 2nd (His 5th career 2nd-place finish) after infamously tangling with brother Geoff while battling for the lead in the second half of the race. For the season Brett recorded a total of 6 top 10 finishes, and ended up 19th in the championship standings. In his 5 seasons driving the No. 26 Quaker State car Bodine posted a total of 5 poles, 1 win, 13 top fives, and 43 top tens while finishing no worse than 20th in the final standings.

For 1995 he signed with Junior Johnson piloting the Lowe's Ford Thunderbird with crew chief Mike Beam. The team had been dominate on the restrictor plate tracks in past years and the #11 car was again fast in Daytona 500 practice. Things took a bad turn when the team was found with an illegal engine manifold during pre-qualifying inspection at Daytona, resulting in a then-record $45,100 fine. The revised engine was not nearly as fast and the team needed a provisional to make the race. Amid rumors of Johnson selling his team, Mike Beam left following the 10th race of the season and took all but two crew members with him. Bodine continued on as the driver with Dean Combs coming on as crew chief, managing top ten finishes at Wilksboro and Pocono, and finished twentieth in points. 1995 would be Brett's 8th consecutive top twenty season in the Cup series. Bodine easily bested the performance of his Junior Johnson Racing teammate, the 27 car driven primarily by Elton Sawyer, which placed 37th in points with 5 DNQs and no top 10s in 1995.

Owner/driver 

After the 1995 season, Johnson sold the team to Bodine and his wife Diane to form Brett Bodine Racing.  In a unique arrangement, the Lowes sponsorship ($4.2 million) for 1996 was paid directly to Johnson to purchase the team while Brett ran the team out of his pocket for the inaugural season.  Bodine was reunited with crew chief Donnie Richeson and scored a top ten finish at Daytona in July, but failed to qualify for a late season race at Martinsville while placing 24th in the standings with 8 top 20 finishes.  Bodine's struggles as a first time owner/driver during the 1996 season were documented in the book Wide Open

After Lowe's left to become the sponsor for Mike Skinner at Richard Childress Racing, he signed Catalyst Communications as a primary sponsor to a three-year, $15 million deal for 1997 and beyond.  The 1997 season started well for the #11 Close Call Ford with top tens at Bristol and Sonoma and a total of 6 top twenties in the first 9 races.  This strong start propelled Bodine to 16th in the points standings. Troubles erupted when Catalyst stopped paying its sponsorship fees, leading to a lawsuit, with Bodine eventually removing all sponsorship decals from the car. The lack of funding took its toll on the team as Bodine failed to qualify for a late season race at Rockingham and the team slipped all the way down to 29th in the final standings, although his final position was still better than the new Lowe's team which placed 30th with driver Mike Skinner.

For 1998 Bodine found reliable sponsorship from Paychex and his Ford Taurus, although the $3 million per year deal was significantly less than that of top teams. He qualified for every race for the first time as an owner/driver, collected 11 top 20 finishes with a season's best 11th-place finish at Bristol and Talladega, and placed 25th in the final standings. Brett was running at the finish of the first 23 races of the 1998 season, tied for the longest streak to start the season. Paychex returned in 1999 but Bodine was unable to carry the momentum of the previous year and slipped to 35th in the standings with just 3 top 20 finishes, including a season's best 12th at Bristol, while failing to qualify for 2 races.

Brett Bodine signed Ralphs Supermarkets to sponsor his car for 2000, and sold half the team to businessman Richard Hilton. The latter deal fell through, but while he was still able to keep Ralphs as a sponsor, the failed buy-out put the team behind in its preparation for the season. Brett struggled and failed to qualify for 5 of the season's first 21 races, falling all the way to 40th in the point standings. Things started to improve after Mike Hillman came on as crew chief mid-season. Bodine qualified for the season's final 13 races with 4 top 20 finishes, including a season's best 14th at Homestead, and finished the season 35th in points.  Brett also set the track record at Indianapolis Motor Speedway during second round qualifying for the Brickyard 400.  This track record would stand until Tony Stewart went faster during qualifying in 2002. Brett became the first Cup series driver to start wearing the HANS device in 2000.

Sole survivor 
By 2001, Brett Bodine was the only remaining owner/driver competing full-time in the NASCAR Cup Series. While common just a few years earlier, single-car owner/driver teams had generally become uncompetitive in NASCAR as the sport became increasingly dependent on engineering, testing data, and sponsorship dollars.  Darrell Waltrip's #17 team had fallen from top 10 placings in the 1991, 1992, and 1994 standings to 29th place in 1996; Waltrip would sell his team partway into the 1998 season after his struggles continued in 1997 and 1998. Ricky Rudd's #10 team had fallen from 6th place in the 1996 standings to 31st place in 1999 even with consistent sponsorship from Tide; Rudd sold his team following the 1999 season.  Bill Elliott's #94 team had fallen from 8th place in the 1995 and 1997 standings to 21st place in 1999 even with consistent sponsorship from McDonald's; Elliott would sell his team following another disappointing performance in 2000. His older brother, Geoffrey Bodine's #7 team had fallen from 16th place in the 1995 standings to 27th place in 1998; Geoff sold his team following the 1998 season.

Ralphs returned as the primary sponsor and Bodine added RedCell Batteries as a major associate for 2001. The #11 Ford with Mike Hillman again serving as crew chief qualified for all of the races, posted top ten finishes at Daytona and Loudon, recorded 9 top 20 finishes, and moved up five positions to 30th in the final standings. RedCell batteries stopped paying their sponsorship bills mid-season and Bodine signed Wells Fargo as a major associate sponsor.  From Charlotte in 2000 through Darlington in 2001, Brett was running at the finish of 31 consecutive races, the longest streak in the Cup Series.  Brett Bodine Racing also expanded to a two-car team for the first time in its history, fielding the No. 09 Ford for older brother Geoff, who himself was struggling to maintain his Winston Cup career, in two races with a best finish of 27th.  Brett also fielded an Xfinity series team in 2 races, qualifying for 1, for nephew Josh Richeson. Ralphs, however, decided not to return as the sponsor of the team following the season.

With no major sponsors Bodine received sponsorship from minor sponsors such as Wells Fargo, Timberland Pro, and Dura Lube.  Three races into the season Hooters was signed to a deal, although at this point Bodine's team was once again well behind in development.  Crew chief Mike Hillman and several other team members had left due to worries about not being able to run the full season without primary sponsorship. Brett had four top 20 finishes, including a season's best 13th at Talladega, but failed to qualify for four late season races and finished 36th in the points. Brett also fielded an Xfinity series team in 9 races (qualifying for 7) for nephew Josh Richeson, with a best finish of 28th.

Hooters returned in 2003, but with less funding than they had provided the previous season. With no major associate sponsors, Brett planned a limited schedule for 2003, attempting 9 (and qualifying for 6) of the season's first 13 races in his #11 Ford. Brett also drove at Darlington in the #57 CLR Ford for Ted Campbell (a race that Bodine's #11 team did not enter). Bodine's best finish of 24th was achieved at Bristol with a special paint scheme on the #11 car commemorating 10 years since Alan Kulwicki's plane crash. Brett placed 4th in the Winston Open, just missing out on qualifying for the All-Star race. Early in the 2003 season Bodine became involved in a difficult time during a divorce from his wife and team co-owner Diane. The dispute lead Bodine to file a restraining order against his wife, whom he alleges hit and threatened to ruin him financially.  Just before the race at Michigan, Hooters withdrew sponsorship from the Bodine racing team. That same weekend, Bodine was seriously injured in a practice accident after running over a piece of debris that cut a right front tire. The impact was violent, knocking Brett unconscious, and he suffered a broken collar bone and damaged teeth. Geoff replaced Brett as the driver in the final race for the #11 Hooters car. He recovered from his injuries and returned with a one race ride with the struggling Morgan-McClure Motorsports, but the car failed to make the field (Mike Skinner, Robert Pressley, Stacy Compton, and Kevin Lepage also had DNQs in the #4 car in 2003). With no major sponsorship for his team and most of his employees laid off, Bodine attempted to run at Indy in a fan sponsored "Brick Car" where, for $500, fans would get their name on the car.  The program was a success and Bodine also picked up a sponsorship from US Micro Corporation. Bodine's qualifying lap tied with Dale Earnhardt Jr. for 36th fastest of the 52 cars making attempts but the tie-break went to Dale by virtue of him being higher in points and as a part time team, Bodine did not have any provisionals available (starting positions 37-43), so he failed to make the field. Rumors of a sponsor for 2004 and beyond surfaced, but nothing panned out and the team was sold. Unable to find a sponsor for his team or a ride with another team, Bodine decided to retire from driving. For his 18-year Winston Cup career Bodine started 480 races with 5 poles, 1 win, 16 top fives, and 61 top tens while winning over 13 million dollars in prize money. In the Busch Series Bodine started 77 races with 16 poles, 5 wins, 31 top fives, and 52 top tens. Brett led more than 1,000 laps in both the Busch Series (1,194) and in the Cup Series (1,040). In the modifieds Brett had 5 wins on NASCAR's modified tour in addition to his many modified wins at the regional level, with him being named one of the 50 greatest modified drivers of all time.

To the NASCAR office 
Bodine went to work for NASCAR in 2004 as the director of cost research at the R&D center, working as a liaison between NASCAR and the race teams on cost reduction efforts. Brett also did all of the driving for NASCAR's Car of Tomorrow prototype. While continuing to work in the R&D center on projects including the Touring Series Spec Engine and the Xfinity Series Composite Body, Brett drove the Cup Series pace car on race day from 2004 to 2018. Currently Brett works as the chairman of the Driver Approval Committee.

Motorsports career results

NASCAR
(key) (Bold – Pole position awarded by qualifying time. Italics – Pole position earned by points standings or practice time. * – Most laps led.)

Winston Cup Series

Daytona 500

Busch Series

Craftsman Truck Series

ARCA Permatex SuperCar Series
(key) (Bold – Pole position awarded by qualifying time. Italics – Pole position earned by points standings or practice time. * – Most laps led.)

References

There is life beyond racing, and Brett Bodine is relishing it
Where Are They Now

External links 
 
 
 

Living people
1959 births
People from Chemung, New York
Racing drivers from New York (state)
NASCAR drivers
NASCAR team owners
Bodine family
Hendrick Motorsports drivers